The Annihilators, published in 1983, was the twentieth novel in the long-running secret agent series Matt Helm by Donald Hamilton.

Plot summary
After the murder of a close friend, assassin Matt Helm finds himself back in the fictional country of Costa Verde (setting for the earlier novel, The Ambushers) and in the middle of a revolution.

External links
Synopsis and summary 

1983 American novels
Matt Helm novels